Dowling is an unincorporated community in Jefferson County, Texas, United States.

Notes

Unincorporated communities in Jefferson County, Texas
Unincorporated communities in Texas